The Vladayska (Владайска река, Vladayska reka) is a river in western Bulgaria, a tributary of the Perlovska.

The river flows from the northwestern slopes of Cherni Vrah on Vitosha Mountain, crossing Torfeno Branishte Nature Reserve, then submerging beneath Zlatnite Mostove Stone River, turning to the northeast at the village of Vladaya from which the river takes its name, entering  Sofia Valley via Vladaya Gorge, and crossing the city of Sofia (featuring the historical ‘Lavov most’ / ‘Lion's Bridge’ in the process) to flow into the Perlovska (a tributary of the Iskar) in its northeastern suburbs.

Rivers of Bulgaria
Geography of Sofia
Landforms of Sofia City Province
Vitosha